The three letter acronym LVC may refer to:

 low voltage CMOS (LVCMOS), a logic family
 74LVC-series integrated circuits, a logic family of integrated circuits
 Lebanon Valley College
 Lee Van Cleef
 Linton Village College
 Live, Virtual, and Constructive
 Liverpool Central railway station, England; National Rail station code LVC.
 Louis Vuitton Cup
 Lutheran Volunteer Corps
 Loaded Vinegar Chips
 Las Vegas Club, a former casino in Las Vegas